A Start in Life is the first novel by Anita Brookner. It was first published by Cape in 1981. It's U.S. title was The Debut. The book was rereleased by Penguin Essentials in 2017.

References

1981 British novels
English novels
Jonathan Cape books
1981 debut novels